Richard Ciupka is a Canadian cinematographer and film director. He is perhaps best known for his work on the 1983 horror film Curtains, as well as his collaborations with Louis Malle on the 1980 film Atlantic City, Alexandre Arcady on the 1985 film Hold-Up and Claude Chabrol on three feature films in France. Ciupka also filmed or directed over 520 television commercials in Canada and the United States. His work on the Canadian drama series Nouvelle adresse garnered him a Gémeaux award for "Best Cinematography (Dramatic)."

Career
Born in Liège, Belgium, Ciupka immigrated to the United States at age six. His first work as a cinematographer was on the Canadian film The Mystery of the Million Dollar Hockey Puck (1975) followed by Ilsa, the Tigress of Siberia (1977) and the television film An American Christmas Carol (1979). He made his directorial debut with the horror film Curtains (1983); however, Ciupka left the production midway through over creative differences with producer Peter R. Simpson and is credited as Jonathan Stryker. Since 2013, Richard has worked as a cinematographer on TV series and feature films.
Richard also produced and Directed/Photograohed  over 520 TV commercials in Canada and the USA.

Filmography

Director

Cinematographer

References

External links

Living people
Belgian emigrants to Canada
Film directors from Quebec
Film people from Liège
Year of birth missing (living people)
Canadian cinematographers